This is a list of the first women lawyer(s) and judge(s) in Virginia. It includes the year in which the women were admitted to practice law (in parentheses). Also included are women who achieved other distinctions such becoming the first in their state to graduate from law school or become a political figure.

Firsts in state history

Law school 

 First female law graduates: Elizabeth N. Tompkins and Jane Brown Ranson in 1923

Lawyers 

First female to practice before state's federal court: Belva Ann Lockwood in 1879 
First females licensed: Rebecca Pearl Lovenstein and Carrie M. Gregory (1920) 
First female to practice before the Virginia Supreme Court: Mildred Callahan in 1923  
First African American female: Lavinia Marian Fleming Poe (1925)
First African American female (full-time government attorney): Alda White 
First African American female (major law firm partner): Jacquelyn Stone in 1994

State judges 

First female: Mary Kerr Moorehead Harris in 1922 
First female (county court): Anna Fancher Hedrick (1930) in 1951 
First female (Virginia Supreme Court): Elizabeth B. Lacy in 1989
 First African American female: Angela Roberts in 1990 
 First African American female (First Judicial Circuit): Eileen A. Olds (1982) in 1995 
 First female (Twenty-Fifth Judicial District): Virginia Anita Filson in 2001 
 First Hispanic American (female): Uley Norris Damiani in 2009 
First African American female (Virginia Supreme Court): Cleo Powell (1982) in 2011 
First female (Chief Justice; Virginia Supreme Court): Cynthia D. Kinser in 2011 
First Asian American female: Maha-Rebekah Abejuela in 2019

Federal judges 
 First African American female (U.S. Court of Appeals for the Fourth Circuit): Allyson Kay Duncan (1975) in 2003 
 First African American female (U.S. District Court for the Eastern District of Virginia): Arenda Wright Allen (1985) in 2011 
First female (U.S. District Court for the Western District of Virginia): Elizabeth K. Dillon (1986) in 2014  
First African American (female) (U.S. Bankruptcy Court for the Eastern District of Virginia): Klinette H. Kindred (1970) in 2017 
 First female (U.S. Court of Appeals for the Fourth Circuit): Barbara Milano Keenan (1991)

Attorney General of Virginia 

First female: Mary Sue Terry (1973) from 1986-1993

Deputy Attorney General 

 First female: Elizabeth B. Lacy in 1982

Virginia Bar Association 

 First female (presidents): Anita Poston and Jeanne Franklin respectively from 2000-2001 and 2001-2002 
First African American (female): Doris Henderson Causey in 2017 
First Latino American female: Stephanie E. Grana in 2022

Firsts in local history

 Eleanor Dobson (1974): First female judge in Arlington County, Virginia (1982)
 Elaine Jones: First African American female to attend and graduate from the University of Virginia School of Law (1970)
 Tania M.L. Saylor: First female of color to serve as a Judge of the Fairfax County Circuity Court (2022)
 Lee Lovett (1947): First female lawyer in Winchester, Virginia, Frederick County, Virginia
 Lorrie A. Sinclair Taylor: First African American (female) judge in Loudoun County, Virginia (2020)
 Stephanie Morales: First female elected as the Commonwealth’s Attorney for Portsmouth, Virginia (2015)
 Janice Wellington: First female (and African American) judge in Prince William County, Virginia (1990)
 Phoebe Hall: First female to serve as the Public Defender for Richmond, Virginia
 Rachel Figura: First female judge for the City of Harrisonburg and Rockingham County, Virginia (2019)
 Kimberly M. Jenkins:  First female judge for the 30th Judicial Circuit Juvenile & Domestic Relations Court, from Scott County, Virginia (2019)
 Alda White: First female (and African American female) to serve as the County Attorney for Stafford County, Virginia
 Suzanne Kuzco Fulton: First female to serve as General District Court Judge for Wise County and the 30th Judicial Circuit (1989-2005)

See also  

 List of first women lawyers and judges in the United States
 Timeline of women lawyers in the United States
 Women in law

Other topics of interest 

 List of first minority male lawyers and judges in the United States
 List of first minority male lawyers and judges in Virginia

References 

Lawyers, Virginia, first
Virginia, first
Women, Virginia, first
Women, Virginia, first
Women in Virginia
Virginia lawyers
Lists of people from Virginia